Zetetics are a Ukrainian alternative music project formed in 2014 by lead singer Lika Bugaeva. Zetetics is influenced from 90s alternative and experimental rock and electronic music.

History
Lika Bugaeva first became known as a contestant on the talent  TV show "The Voice". The band's debut album, "Finally I see", was rated the best Ukrainian album of 2015, by 'Inspired'. Their single "Fly Away" is well known for its video, in which Lika was singing in sign language.

In autumn 2015, the band released a new album "Zetetic". "Zetetic" is a little used English word from Greek and  Latin, that translates as “those who are looking for the truth”. The album was praised  by Comma.com.ua and BeeHype.

The band has released its first full concert video — Live in Kyiv.

In winter 2017, the band released "Rooftop Live" — a music film about the band. 

In September, 2019 Zetetics released their third studio album, titled 11:11. Logline of album is about self-knowledge and the purity of self-talk. Each song has an undertone of mystical realism.

The band composed and performed the music for the film Nightmare Director also known as  School Number 5, which was released in October 2019.

In June 2020, Zetetics, led by Anzhelika, took part in the official selection of the country's cultural diplomacy — the Music Catalogue of the Ukrainian Institute, which is the official cultural representation of Ukraine. The mission of the institute is to popularize Ukrainian cultural products and artists in the world.

On November 24, 2021, the band presented their fourth studio album Cold Star with AWAL label.

In February 2022 the band postponed their planned tour due to the Russian invasion of Ukraine.

In April 2022 the band returned to concert shows for a charity to Ukraine.

Discography

Albums
 2014 Finally I see
 2015 Zetetic
 2016 Unplugged
 2019 11:11
 2021 Cold Star

Singles
 2017 Even Tonight
 2018 I Have Nothing
 2018 Homeless
 2019 Round And Round
 2019 Burning
 2019 Stop Me
 2020 Salt
 2020 Lotus

Live shows 
Live in Kyiv
 Unplugged
 Rooftop Live

Music videos 
Fly Away
 Dance With Me
You and I
 Get You Up
 Even Tonight
 Lotus

References

External links 

 Interview with Lika Bugaeva by Bestin.ua.
 The film-quest about the enamored maniac by Karabas Live.
 Listen Ukrainian. TOP-15 by TSN.
 Zetetics New Album by L'officiel Online.
 Best Ukrainian Albums 2015 by Comma.com.ua.
 Looking for the truth interview by Maincream.
 Лика Бугаева выпустила клип на языке жестов by TSN.ua
 Official Instagram account

 Official website

Musical groups established in 2014
Ukrainian rock music groups
English-language singers from Ukraine
2014 establishments in Ukraine